Kadron Boone (born September 13, 1991) is a Canadian football wide receiver. He played college football at LSU.

Professional career
On May 10, 2014, Boone signed with the Philadelphia Eagles as an undrafted free agent. He was released on August 23, 2014, and was then signed to the St. Louis Rams practice squad on October 21. The Rams cut Boone on October 29, and the Indianapolis Colts signed him to their practice squad on December 31, 2014.

On May 9, 2016 Boone signed with the New York Giants. On August 30, 2016, he was waived by the Giants.

Boone was signed to the Saskatchewan Roughriders' practice roster on October 25, 2016. He was promoted to the active roster on October 28, 2016.

References

External links
Philadelphia Eagles bio
LSU Tigers bio

1991 births
Living people
Sportspeople from Ocala, Florida
American football wide receivers
Canadian football wide receivers
American players of Canadian football
LSU Tigers football players
Philadelphia Eagles players
St. Louis Rams players
New York Giants players
Saskatchewan Roughriders players